Arlanzón may refer to:

 Arlanzón (river), a tributary of the Arlanza in Burgos, Spain
 Arlanzón, Province of Burgos, a municipality in Castile and León, Spain